Vahtrepa Landscape Conservation Area is a nature park which is located in Hiiu County, Estonia.

The area of the nature park is 1395 ha.

The protected area was founded in 1962 to protect Kallaste Cliff. In 1998, the protected area was designated to the landscape conservation area.

References

Nature reserves in Estonia
Geography of Hiiu County